Alik Sakharov (born May 17, 1959) is a film and television director. A former Director of Photography, he is an active member of the American Society of Cinematographers (ASC).

Career
Sakharov entered the US film scene when he began sharing the responsibilities of a lighting cameraman in 1985 in the New York industrial video scene, eventually progressing to shooting music videos, commercials, narrative films.

Sakharov served as Director of Photography on numerous feature films, as well as a formidable number of programs for network television and premium cable, most notably on HBO's The Sopranos (38 episodes), and, as Director/cinematographer, on HBO's Rome (10 episodes), and Game of Thrones (8 episodes). He served as Director/co-Executive Producer on the third season of Starz' television series Black Sails.

In seasons one and two of Netflix series Marco Polo Sakharov directed: "Feast"; "The Fourth Step"; "Lost Crane"; "The Fellowship". He directed a Marco Polo stand-alone Christmas-special episode, entitled "Marco Polo: One Hundred Eyes".

In 2016 he directed episodes of Goliath for the Amazon Studios. That same year, he joined Netflix' House of Cards, directing chapters 55, 56, 59, 66, and 72. 

In 2018, he directed episodes of Ozark. Later that year, Sakharov joined The Witcher. After completing nearly three episodes in season one, he amicably parted ways with the project. In 2019, Sakharov returned to Ozark to direct the mega-block of the last four episodes in season three. He received an Outstanding Directing for a Drama Series Emmy Nomination for the penultimate episode of the season "Fire Pink". In 2022, Sakharov joined AppleTV+ Invasion (2021 TV series) as a Director/Executive Producer.

Awards
As a member of the Sopranos creative ensemble, Sakharov was honored twice (in 2002 & 2004) by the American Film Institute's A Year of Excellence Award.

In 2004, Sakharov earned the 19th Annual ASC Awards nomination for Outstanding Achievement in Cinematography in a single camera category for The Sopranos episode "Long Term Parking".

In 2007, Sakharov won the Primetime Emmy Award for Outstanding Cinematography for the ROME episode "Passover".

In 2013, Sakharov won the OFTA Award for Best Direction In A Drama Series for Game of Thrones.

In 2020, Sakharov earned a Primetime Emmy Award Nomination for Outstanding Directing in a Drama Series for Ozark episode "Fire Pink".

Credentials
Since 2006 Sakharov has worked primarily as a television director, with credits including:

Boardwalk Empire
Game of Thrones
Rome
Dexter
Rubicon
Brotherhood
The Sopranos (2nd unit director "Made in America"; "Kennedy and Heidi")
Easy Money
The Americans
Black Sails
Marco Polo
Flesh and Bone
House of Cards
Counterpart
Ozark
Goliath
The Witcher

References

External links 

1959 births
Living people
American television directors
American cinematographers
American people of Uzbek descent